Ali Kathawa (An Elephant's Tale) is a 2017 Sri Lankan Sinhala children's film directed by Sunil Ariyaratne and produced by Gunapala Rathnasekara for Sipvin Films. It stars a child artist Kaushalya Nirmana in lead role along with Ravindra Randeniya, Tharuka Wanniarachchi, Dhananjaya Siriwardena and Yohani Hansika. Music composed by Rohana Weerasinghe. It is the 1276th Sri Lankan film in the Sinhala cinema.
The film is based on the novel Anusha Saha Raja Kumaru written by Leticia Boteju.

Cast 
 Kaushalya Nirmana as Bhanu ( Main Actor )
 Yohani Hansika as Sumangali
 Dhananjaya Siriwardena as King 
 Tharuka Wanniarachchi as Queen 
 Ravindra Randeniya as Hermit      
 Duleeka Marapana as Veddah Gomari          
 Rodney Warnakula as Kinnara leader    
 Sarath Kothalawala as Handuna veddah  
 Kumara Thirimadura as Gobila veddha   
 Wilson Gunaratne as  Maha Amathi
 Deepani Silva as God beseecher 
 Giriraj Kaushalya as King's physician 
 Jayantha Muthuthanthri as Kinnara leader's servant

Production 
The script based on a story by Leticia Botheju, Anusha and Raja Kumaru. All scenes of baby elephants were filmed in Chiang Mai - Thailand. Other scenes were shot in Sri Lanka.

Soundtrack

References

External links

අලිකතාවෙන් සම්මාන දිනූ ඉරෝෂන් මධුෂංක
සරසවිය සම්මාන පොතට වාර්තාවක් ගෙනා විදූශා නේත්‍රාංජලී

2010s children's films
2017 films
2010s Sinhala-language films